Namibia competed in the 1994 Commonwealth Games held in Victoria, British Columbia.

Medals

Medalists

1994
Com
Nations at the 1994 Commonwealth Games